Amir Abbas Moradi Ganji (born 21 September 1985) is an Iranian wrestler. He is junior world champion in 2005 budapest and two time Asian Championships silver medalist.

References
 

1985 births
Living people
Iranian male sport wrestlers
20th-century Iranian people
21st-century Iranian people